Barchaniella mus is a moth in the family Cossidae. It is found in south-eastern Iran.

The length of the forewings is 14–16 mm. The pattern on the forewings resembles that of Barchaniella inspersus, but there is a small light spot at the hindmargin. The hindwings are brown. Adults are on wing in April.

References

Natural History Museum Lepidoptera generic names catalog

Cossinae
Moths described in 1902
Moths of Asia